Ordeal in the Arctic is a television film written by Paul F. Edwards and directed by Mark Sobel. The film stars Richard Chamberlain, Catherine Mary Stewart, Melanie Mayron, Scott Hylands and Page Fletcher.

The accident that Ordeal in the Arctic  depicted, occurred on October 30, 1991, when Canadian Forces Lockheed CC-130E Hercules (130322), from 435 Transport and Rescue Squadron (a part of Operation Boxtop), was flying from Edmonton, Alberta via Thule Air Base, Greenland on a bi-annual resupply mission to Canadian Forces Station Alert. At night, while on final approach to the airstrip, the pilot apparently was flying by sight rather than relying on instruments. The aircraft struck a rocky slope and crashed on Ellesmere Island, approximately 16 km (9.9 miles) short of the runway, resulting in the death of four of the 18 passengers and crew. Subsequent rescue efforts by personnel from CFS Alert, USAF personnel from Thule AB and CF personnel from 440 Squadron, CFB Edmonton, Alberta, and Trenton, Ontario, were hampered by a blizzard and local terrain. The pilot died of exposure while awaiting rescue.

Plot
While heading to Alert in the far north on October 30, 1991, pilot Captain John Couch misjudges his altitude and crashes 10 miles from the base. Master Corporal Roland Pitre, the loadmaster, is the first to die while three others also do not survive the impact: Warrant Officer, Robert Grimsley, Master Warrant Officer, Tom Jardine, and Captain Judy Trépanier.

Of the survivors, Susan Hillier, and Master Corporal, David Meace, because of possible spinal injuries, cannot be moved to the tail end of the aircraft with the others. During the 32-hour ordeal, Couch makes multiple trips to check on Sue and Dave, while Captain Wilma De Groot, keeps the others calm, before succumbing in the cold weather.

Although they are able to see the base prior to the crash, blizzard-like conditions prevent anyone from going for help. Once search and rescue crews are sent to look for the aircraft, survivors are able to communicate with Boxtop 21, searching by air using a two-way radio. As the weather calms, search and rescue (SAR) technicians are able to parachute down to the site, while those searching by ground arrive soon after.

Cast

 Richard Chamberlain as Captain John Couch
 Catherine Mary Stewart as Captain Wilma De Groot
 Melanie Mayron as Susan "Sue" Hillier
 Scott Hylands as Fred Ritchie
 Page Fletcher as Lieutenant Joe Bales
 Christopher Bolton as Lieutenant Michael "Mike" Moore
 Richard McMillan as Bob Thompson (credited as Richard MacMillan)
 Tom Butler as Arnie Macauley 
 Robert Clinton as Sergeant Paul West
 Blair Haynes as Master Corporal Roland "Rollie" Pitre
 Stephen Sparks as Master Corporal Tony Cobden
 Brian Jensen  as Master Corporal David "Dave" Meace
 Larry Yachimec as Warrant Officer Robert Grimsley
 Cecily A. Adams as Captain Judy Trépanier
 Nathan Fillion as Master Warrant Officer Tom Jardine
 Stephen Sparks as Tony Cobden
 Mark Gibbon as Master Seaman "Monty" Montgomery

 David Cameron as Master Corporal Mario Ellefsen
 Steve Adams as Private Bill Vance
 David McNally as Marc Tremblay
 Larry Musser as Rick Dumoulin
 Francis Damberger as Jimmy Brown
 Fred Keating as Major MacLain
 Wendell Smith as Major Blair
 Paul Whitney as Marvin Macauley
 Dave Nichols as Don Hansen
 Aaron Goettel as Tech No. 1
 Karen Gartner as Tech No. 2
 Mike Kobayashi as himself
 Dodd Rougeau as Condly
 Garry Chalk as Rescue 242 Pilot
 Brian Taylor as Boxtop 21 Pilot
 Roger Shank as Nodwell Driver
 Darryl Shuttleworth as  Ground Commander

Production
Ordeal in the Arctic was filmed at Canadian Forces Base Edmonton over a four-week period in November and December 1992. Although a northerly location in Canada, the terrain is very different from the tundra of Alert, Nunavut. To replicate the sunless conditions near the North Pole, filming was done mainly at night. Master Corporal Mike Kobayashi, an SAR Tech from 440 Squadron, who participated in the actual rescue, portrayed himself in the film. Another SAR Tech involved in the rescue, Master Corporal Tim Eagle from 440 Squadron, acted as the SAR technical advisor.

Ordeal in the Arctic is an adaptation of Robert Mason Lee's non-fiction book Death and Deliverance: The Haunting True Story of the Hercules Crash at the North Pole. His book thoroughly documented the 1991 crash and subsequent rescue.

Reception
Ordeal in the Arctic was considered a typical "made-for-TV" production, although it had the advantage of covering a story that had recently been in the news. Despite the real-life heroics, reviews were mainly tepid. Patricia Brennan from The Washington Post advised: "If you sit down to watch “Ordeal in the Arctic,” bring along a cup of tea.  It's a movie that's a little hard to warm up to." Reviewer Chris Willman from the Los Angeles Times wrote, "Considerable heroism is involved in this true-life survival story, to be sure – but, truth be told, it's mostly a bunch of people sitting around in the dark shivering."

References

Notes

Citations

Bibliography

 Lee, Robert Mason. Death and Deliverance: The Haunting True Story of the Hercules Crash at the North Pole (aka Death and Deliverance: The True Story of an Airplane Crash at the North Pole). Golden, Colorado: Fulcrum Publishing, 1993. .

External links
 
 
 Richard Chamberlain page about the film

1993 films
Accidents and incidents involving the Lockheed C-130 Hercules
Canadian aviation films
Canadian television films
English-language Canadian films
Canadian films based on actual events
Films about aviation accidents or incidents
Films set in the Arctic
Films shot in Edmonton
ABC Motion Pictures films
Canadian Armed Forces in films
Films directed by Mark Sobel
1990s Canadian films